Anas Al-Sheghri (born 1988) was a leading activist in the protests in the beginning of the Syrian Civil War.

Life and Activism 
Anas Ali Al-Shegri was born in the village of al-Baydha near the city of Banyas. He was in his third year as a student at the School of Economics at Latakia Tishreen University, when the Syrian Uprising against the government of Bashar al-Assad erupted in March 2011.

According to his biography at Free Syrian Translators website, Anas played a leading role in stimulating the protests that called for democracy and for the toppling of al-Assad's government in the city of Banyas, which is considered the second city to rebel in Syria after Daraa.

Anas had also played an important role in the media coverage of the uprising. He was one of the first Syrian activists inside the country to speak to the Media using his real name. It is also important to mention that Banyas was the first city to broadcast its demonstrations live to the news media.

Anas was arrested on May 14, 2011 when the Syrian army and the security forces along with the Shabbiha stormed the city of Banyas. Dunia TV (which is very close to the Syrian government) announced that the reason behind Anas' arrest is his alleged involvement in an attempt to establish an Islamic State and his appointment as the "Minister of Interior" in this alleged state.

The fate of Anas and his whereabouts are not yet known. It is not affirmed whether he has died at some detention center that belongs to one of the various Intelligence agencies in Syria or he is still alive. What is certain, though, is that he became one of the icons of the Syrian revolution against Bashar al-Assad.

Sources
Free Syrian Translators: Faces from the Syrian Revolution: Anas Al-Sheghri

1988 births
Living people
Syrian democracy activists
Syrian dissidents
Date of birth missing (living people)